In enzymology, a cysteine transaminase is an enzyme that catalyzes the chemical reaction

L-cysteine + 2-oxoglutarate  mercaptopyruvate + L-glutamate

Thus, the two substrates of this enzyme are L-cysteine and 2-oxoglutarate, whereas its two products are mercaptopyruvate and L-glutamate.

This enzyme belongs to the family of transferases, specifically the transaminases, which transfer nitrogenous groups.  The systematic name of this enzyme class is L-cysteine:2-oxoglutarate aminotransferase. Other names in common use include cysteine aminotransferase, L-cysteine aminotransferase, and CGT.  This enzyme participates in cysteine metabolism.  It employs one cofactor, pyridoxal phosphate.

References

 

EC 2.6.1
Pyridoxal phosphate enzymes
Enzymes of unknown structure